The ALCO Century 415 was a diesel-electric locomotive of B-B wheel arrangement produced by the American Locomotive Company (ALCO) as part of their Century Series of locomotives.

Specifications
The C415 was a large switcher or small road switcher equipped with a raised cab mounted slightly off-center, with a lower, narrower hood on either side.  The longer one contained the diesel engine, a  eight-cylinder turbocharged Alco 251-F, while the shorter contained auxiliaries.  The C415 could be ordered with three different cab heights; a low one for minimum clearances, a regular height one, and an extra-height one for maximum visibility.
 
Trucks fitted were either Type B road trucks or ALCO Hi-Ad (high adhesion).

Service history
The locomotive was not very popular; 26 were built between 1966 and 1968 for seven different owners. The locomotive is still in use today. According to the November 2011 issue of Railfan & Railroad magazine, the Burlington Junction Railway now owns three C415s numbered 21, 701 and 702.

Original owners
Hamersley Iron in Western Australia bought the prototype in May 1968, formerly lettered as ALCO 415.  The locomotive was equipped with a medium height cab and AAR Type B trucks.
Chehalis Western Railroad bought a single high cab unit with Hi-Ad trucks. 
Columbia and Cowlitz Railway bought a single high cab unit with Hi-Ad trucks. (Both the Columbia and Cowlitz and the Chehalis Western are Weyerhaeuser properties)
Monongahela Connecting Railroad bought a single low cab unit with Hi-Ad trucks.
Chicago, Rock Island and Pacific Railroad bought ten medium cab units with AAR Type B trucks.
Southern Pacific Railroad bought ten high cab units with Type B road trucks.
Spokane, Portland and Seattle Railway bought two medium cab units with Hi-Ad trucks; these were passed to the Burlington Northern Railroad, 4010-4011 after a merger between the two railroads.

Preservation
Southern Pacific Railroad 2406 is in Monterrey, Mexico, lettered as Fundidora Monterrey Steel 25.
Hamersley Iron 1000, formerly Alco Demonstrator 415 is at the Pilbara Railways Historical Society in Western Australia.
Monongahela Connecting Railroad 701 is at the Railroad Museum of Pennsylvania.
Chehalis Western Railroad 684 is at Fife History Museum.
Buffalo Southern Railroad 423, formerly Chicago, Rock Island and Pacific Railroad 423 is at the Buffalo Southern's Hamburg Shops in Hamburg, New York.

See also
List of ALCO diesel locomotives

References

Further reading
 

Century 415
B-B locomotives
Diesel-electric locomotives of the United States
Diesel locomotives of Western Australia
Railway locomotives introduced in 1966
Standard gauge locomotives of Australia
Standard gauge locomotives of the United States
Diesel-electric locomotives of Australia